W. Maynard Sparks (16 December 1906 – 17 August 1999) was an American Bishop of the Evangelical United Brethren Church (E.U.B.) and of the United Methodist Church, elected in 1958.

Birth and family
He was born on 16 December 1906 in Rockwood, Pennsylvania, a son of the Rev. George A. and Sarah (Heefner) Sparks.  His father was a pastor in the Church of the United Brethren in Christ (i.e., New Constitution).  Bishop Sparks was married to Blanche May Frank Sparks, who died in 1989.  They had three sons:  Lynn (a clergy member of the Rocky Mountain Annual Conference of the U.M. Church, who died in a mountain climbing accident in 1978), Fred of Elk Grove, California, and Robert of Lebanon, Pennsylvania.  The Sparkses also had four grandchildren and two great-grandchildren (at the time of the bishop's death).

Education
W. Maynard Sparks earned a B.A. degree from (United Brethren) Lebanon Valley College in Annville, Pennsylvania.  He earned a Bachelor of Divinity degree from his denomination's only seminary, United Theological Seminary in Dayton, Ohio.  He went on to earn a Master of Education degree from the University of Pittsburgh.

Ordained ministry
W. Maynard Sparks was granted a Quarterly Conference License to Preach at the age of thirteen!  This was followed by a permanent license.  Later, he entered the ministry of the Allegheny Annual Conference of the Church of the United Brethren in Christ (i.e., New Constitution).  He served as the pastor of churches in Pennsylvania, as a conference superintendent, and as assistant professor of religion and chaplain at Lebanon Valley College.  He was elected a delegate to the 1946 Uniting Conference, which joined the Evangelical Church and the Church of the United Brethren in Christ (i.e., New Constitution).

Episcopal ministry
Sparks was elected to the episcopacy of the E.U.B. Church in 1958 in Harrisburg, Pennsylvania. As a bishop he supervised his denomination's Western Area.  Among the highlights of his ministry, Bishop Sparks represented the E.U.B. Church in 1961 at independence ceremonies for the African nation of Sierra Leone, where he later also presided over several annual conference sessions.  The E.U.B. Church had engaged in missionary activities in that Nation for many years.

Following the 1968 merger of the E.U.B. and Methodist Churches, Bishop Sparks was assigned to the Seattle Episcopal Area, serving there until his retirement in 1972.  While in Seattle, he also served for approximately eighteen months as interim bishop of the Portland, Oregon Area following the death of Bishop Everett W. Palmer in January 1971.

Death and funeral
Bishop Sparks died 17 August 1999 at his home in Sacramento, California, at the age of 92.

At the time of his death he was one of only two surviving bishops of the former E.U.B. Church, the other being Bishop Paul W. Milhouse of Franklin, Indiana.  At the time of the 1968 E.U.B.-Methodist merger, there were one retired and seven active E.U.B. bishops.  A memorial service for Bishop Sparks was held 25 August 1999 at 10:00 a.m. at the Faith United Methodist Church, 3600 J. Street, Sacramento, CA 95816.

See also
List of bishops of the United Methodist Church

References

Further reading
United Methodist News Service.
Milhouse, Paul W., Nineteen Bishops of the Evangelical United Brethren Church, Nashville, The Parthenon Press, 1974.

Bishops of the Evangelical United Brethren Church
American chaplains
1999 deaths
University and college chaplains in America
American United Methodist bishops
1906 births
Lebanon Valley College alumni
Lebanon Valley College faculty
United Theological Seminary alumni
People from Somerset County, Pennsylvania
People from Sacramento, California
20th-century American clergy